The Polish–Lithuanian union was a relationship created by a series of acts and alliances between the Crown of the Kingdom of Poland and the Grand Duchy of Lithuania that lasted for prolonged periods of time from 1385 and led to the creation of the Polish–Lithuanian Commonwealth, or the "Republic of the Two Nations", in 1569 and eventually to the creation of a unitary state in 1791.

History 
Important historical events included:
 1385 – Union of Krewo, a personal union that brought the Grand Duke of Lithuania, Jogaila, to the Polish throne as a result of his marriage to Jadwiga of Poland
 1401 – Union of Vilnius and Radom, which strengthened the Polish–Lithuanian union
 1413 – Union of Horodło, a heraldic union that granted many szlachta rights to Lithuanian nobility
 1432 (1432–34) – Union of Grodno, a declarative attempt to renew a closer union
 1499 – Union of Kraków and Vilnius in which the personal union became a dynastic union and recognised the sovereignty of Lithuania and described relations between the two states
 1501 – Union of Mielnik, a renewal of the personal union
 July 1, 1569 – Union of Lublin, a real union that resulted in creation of the semi-federal, semi-confederal Republic of the Two Nations (Polish–Lithuanian Commonwealth)
 May 3, 1791 – Polish Constitution of May 3, 1791: abolished the elective monarchy and turned it into a hereditary monarchy and established a common state, the Rzeczpospolita Polska (Polish Commonwealth), in its place. The Reciprocal Guarantee of Two Nations modified the changes by stressing the continuity of binational status of the state. The changes were reversed completely in 1792 under pressure from the Russian Empire.

See also
 Polish–Lithuanian–Ruthenian Commonwealth
 Polish–Lithuanian–Muscovite Commonwealth
 Union of Kėdainiai
 Polish–Swedish union

Notes

References
  Anna Pasterak, Unie polsko-litewskie, Pedagogical University of Cracow, 2004
Central European Superpower, Henryk Litwin, BUM Magazine, October 2016

 
.
Early Modern history of Lithuania
 
Political history of Lithuania
Political history of Poland
National unifications
States and territories established in 1385
States and territories disestablished in 1569
.
.
.
.
.
.
Lithuania–Poland relations
1385 establishments in Europe
1569 disestablishments in Europe